Leask is a village in the Canadian province of Saskatchewan within the Rural Municipality of Leask No. 464 and Census Division No. 16. It is the administrative centre of the Mistawasis First Nation band government and the Rural Municipality of Leask No. 464.

History 
Leask incorporated as a village on September 3, 1912.

Demographics 

See also 

 List of communities in Saskatchewan
 Villages of Saskatchewan

References

Villages in Saskatchewan
Leask No. 464, Saskatchewan
Division No. 16, Saskatchewan